The timeline of major famines in India prior to 1765 covers major famines in India from 1 AD to 1765 AD. The famines included here span the entirety of the Indian subcontinent, currently comprising the Republic of India, Islamic Republic of Pakistan and the People's Republic of Bangladesh. The year 1765 is chosen as the end date as that was the start of the colonial period.

Timeline

References

Famines in India
famines
famines
famines